Wynne is a surname of Welsh origin. This is a list of notable people with the surname, sorted by profession:

Art, literature, and music
Bill Wynne (1922–2021), American photographer and writer
David Wynne (composer) (1900–83), Welsh composer
David Wynne (sculptor) (born 1926), British sculptor
Frank Wynne (born 1962), Irish translator and writer
Ed Wynne (born 1961), British musician and son of sculptor David Wynne
Ed Wynne (saxophonist), musician with the Doobie Brothers
Gladys Wynne, Irish watercolour artist
Giustiniana Wynne (1737–1791), Anglo-Venetian author, A.K.A Countess Orsini-Rosenberg of Austria
Madeline Yale Wynne (1847−1918), American artist, teacher, and philanthropist
Michael Wynne (playwright), British playwright
Philippé Wynne (1941–84), American R&B vocalist

Athletes
Ian Wynne (born 1973), British flatwater canoeist
John Wynne (ice hockey) (born 1971), Canadian ice hockey defenceman
Marvell Wynne (baseball player) (born 1959), American baseball outfielder
Marvell Wynne (soccer) (born 1986), American football player
Susan Wynne (fl. 1987–94), American figure skater

Law, military, and politics
Sir Arthur Singleton Wynne (1846–1936), British army general from Ireland
Edward Wynne (chancellor) (1681–1755), Welsh lawyer and landowner
Edward Wynne (colonial governor) (fl. 1621–26), early Newfoundland colonist, proprietary governor of the Ferryland colony from 1621 to 1626
Edward Wynne (jurist) (1734–1784), English lawyer and scholar
Edward Wynne-Pendarves (1775–1853), British politician
Greville Wynne (1919–90), British spy
Kathleen Wynne (born 1953), Canadian politician - Premier of Ontario
Khalid Shameem Wynne (1953–2017), Pakistani four-star general and Chairman of the Joint Chiefs of Staff Committee
Michael Wynne (born 1944), American businessman, Secretary of the Air Force
Robert Wynne (1851–1922), American politician
Robert Wynne (Virginia politician) (1622–75), Virginia colonial politician, Speaker of the Virginia House of Burgesses
William Watkin Edward Wynne (1801–1880), Welsh politician and antiquarian

Other
Angus G. Wynne (1914–1979), American businessman, founder of Six Flags theme parks
Arthur Wynne (1862–1945), English-American inventor of the crossword puzzle
Arthur Beavor Wynne (1837–1906), Irish geologist
Billy Wynne (1919-2000), Church of Ireland cleric & founder of the Samaritans in Ireland
Ellis Wynne (1671–1734), Welsh clergyman
Emanuel Wynne (fl. c. 1700), French pirate 
Henry John Wynne (1864–1950), New Zealand engineer
Jane Wynne (1944–2009), English paediatrician
Jay Wynne (fl. since 1994), British television & radio weather forecaster
Lyman Wynne (1925–2007), American psychiatrist and psychologist
Owen Wynne (disambiguation), several people of this name
George Robert Wynne (1833-1912), Church of Ireland cleric and author

See also
Wynne (disambiguation)
Wynn (disambiguation)
Wyn, a surname
Wyne (disambiguation)

Surnames of Welsh origin